Kirti Stambh is a mountain of the Garhwal Himalaya in Uttarakhand India.The elevation of Kirti Stambh is  and its prominence is . It is 128th highest located entirely within the Uttrakhand. Nanda Devi, is the highest mountain in this category. It lies between Thalaysagar and Bhartekunta. Its nearest higher neighbor Bhartekunta  lies 2.3 km SE. It is located 5.1 km SSE of Thalaysagar  and 12.8 km NEE lies Bhagirathi I .

Climbing history
A Scottish team comprising Rick Allen, Ernie McGlashan, Malcolm McCullough, Beverley Hurwood, and Roy F. Lindsay, of Scottish Mountaineering Club had the first Ascent of Kirti Stambh via NE face by R. F. Allen on 20 October 1982. 
on their first attempt on 4 October, McGlashan and Allen found an easy route avoiding the major dangers. They reached a high point  of 6000 m but just fell short of 270 m because of bad weather.
A second attempt by Lindsay and McCullough on 7–8 October they  bivouac at high point of 5425 m. Next day McCullough was suffering from altitude sickness and they had to came down to a lower altitude. while returning Lindsay was hit by an avalanche and both retreated to base camp.

Only on the third attempt it was successfully climbed. Allen had a solo attempt. On the evening of 19 October he reached the col between P 6254 m  and Kirti Stambh and Bivouac at the col. On 20 October after negotiating the bergschrund difficulties on the summit snowfield,  he reached the summit of Kirti Stambh at 9.20 a.m.

Glaciers and rivers

Kirti Bamak lies on the NE side of Kirti Stambh. On the SW side lies Bhartekunta Bamak. Kirti Bamak joins Gangotri glacier. From the snout of Gangotri Glacier comes out Bhagirathi River one of the main tributaries of river Ganga. which later joins Alaknanda river the other main tributaries of river Ganga at Dev Prayag and became Ganga there after. On the other side Bhartekunta Bamak drain down to Bhilangana River which later joins Bhagirathi River near Tehri Dam.

Neighboring peaks
neighboring peaks of Kirti Stambh: 
 Chaukhamba I: 
 Bhagirathi I: 
 Kedarnath Peak: 
 Kedarnath Dome: 
 Sumeru Parbat: 
 Mandani Parbat:

See also

 List of Himalayan peaks of Uttarakhand

References

Mountains of Uttarakhand
Six-thousanders of the Himalayas
Geography of Chamoli district